= Nycterina =

Nycterina may refer to:

- Dracula nycterina, a plant in the family Orchidaceae
- Circbotys nycterina; an insect in the family Pyralidae
